Look at Life is a 1965 one-minute short student film by George Lucas, produced for a course in animation while Lucas was a film student at USC Film School. The film's running time of exactly one minute was required by the course. This was the first film made by George Lucas, and was heavily influenced by Canadian filmmaker Arthur Lipsett.

Summary
The film is a montage of various iconic photographs focusing mostly on common themes from youth culture in the 1960s, with a frenetic percussion soundtrack taken from the film Black Orpheus. The imagery includes photographs of Martin Luther King Jr., Nikita Khrushchev, American race riots, the Ku Klux Klan, Buddhist monks, beagle puppies and bodies of dead soldiers. The only narration in the film is a man's voice yelling the text of Proverbs 10:12, "Hate stirreth up strife, while love covereth all sins." The film ends with written text: "ANYONE FOR SURVIVAL", followed by "End" and "?".

Availability 
The film is included in the documentary A Legacy of Filmmakers: The Early Years of American Zoetrope, which was released on the DVD and Blu-ray releases of Lucas' first feature film, THX 1138.

See also
List of American films of 1965
Still image film
Life Magazine

References

External links 
 
 The entire official short on YouTube posted by Academy of Achievement

1965 films
1965 short films
American short films
Short films directed by George Lucas
American student films
Films about Martin Luther King Jr.
Films about the Ku Klux Klan
Collage film
1960s English-language films